Life, Death, Love and Freedom is the 20th folk rock album by singer-songwriter John Mellencamp and produced by T-Bone Burnett. It was released on July 15, 2008. At the end of 2008, Rolling Stone magazine named Life, Death, Love and Freedom No. 5 on its list of the 50 best albums of the year. The song "Troubled Land" was number 48 on Rolling Stones list of the 100 Best Singles of 2008. Antimusic.com named it number 18 on their top albums of the decade list. The album was named No. 38 in Qs 50 Best Albums of the Year 2008.

Mellencamp has characterized the album as a collection of "modern electric folk songs." The album's first single was "My Sweet Love," and it was serviced to radio on June 10, 2008.

In the liner notes to his 2010 box set On the Rural Route 7609, Mellencamp said of Life, Death, Love and Freedom: "I would put that album, that collection of songs, up against any record ever made. In my mind that record is as good as just about any record ever made. That's a good feeling, to be able to finally say, 'hey, after nearly two dozen albums, I finally made a record that I think is as good as anything out there.'"

Release
Life, Death, Love and Freedom was the first album release to use the ΧΟΔΕ (CODE) process. T-Bone Burnett worked with engineers to develop CODE, a proprietary audio technology that creates high-definition audio files. The CODE version of "Life, Death, Love and Freedom" is on a DVD that was packaged along with the standard CD version of the album.

Track listing
All songs written by John Mellencamp.
"Longest Days" – 3:11
"My Sweet Love" – 3:27
"If I Die Sudden" – 3:45
"Troubled Land" – 3:23
"Young Without Lovers" – 2:49
"John Cockers" – 3:51
"Don't Need This Body" – 3:26
"A Ride Back Home" – 3:12
duet with Karen Fairchild of Little Big Town
"Without a Shot" – 3:40
"Jena" – 3:41
"Mean" – 2:34
"County Fair" – 3:41
"For the Children" – 4:36
"A Brand New Song" – 3:58

Charts

References

External links

John Mellencamp albums
2008 albums
Albums produced by T Bone Burnett
Hear Music albums